The following passenger rail lines were operated by the Pacific Electric Railway and its successors from the time of its merger in 1911 until the last line was abandoned in 1961. One count indicated that the company and its successors operated as many as 143 different routes in that time.

List of lines
There were three primary terminals in downtown Los Angeles:
6th & Main Station, opened 1905 on the south side of 6th Street between Main and Los Angeles Streets; served the Northern and Southern Divisions via several approaches including an elevated line from Santa Fe Street.  This elevated station was not built until about 1916.
Hill Street Station, opened 1908 on the west side of Hill Street between 4th and 5th Streets; moved to the south side of the Subway Terminal in 1926; served the Western Division via both directions on Hill Street
Subway Terminal, opened 1925 on the west side of Hill Street south of 4th Street; served the Western Division via the Hollywood Subway

Local lines
The Los Angeles Railway operated most local lines in central Los Angeles, but the Pacific Electric had local systems in a number of other areas:
East Washington 
Long Beach 
Pasadena
Pomona
Redlands
Riverside
San Bernardino
San Pedro
Santa Monica

Dual gauge track 
The PE and the Los Angeles Railway shared some dual gauge / track along Hawthorne Boulevard, on Main Street and on 4th Street.

References

Pacific Electric Railway Lines
Pacific Electric Railway Lines